Andrew Kishino (born March 20, 1970), also known as Big Kish (formerly Kish), is a Canadian voice actor.

Life and career 
Kishino is best known for his 1991 single "I Rhyme the World in 80 Days". The song was featured on his debut album, Order from Chaos. It was accompanied by a music video which was played on MuchMusic. The song reached number one on the RPM Cancon chart. The second single released from the album, "She's a Flirt", also reached number one on the same chart. His follow-up album, A Nation of Hoods, was released in 1994.

He later moved to Los Angeles to work as a hip hop music producer.

From 2001 to 2007, Kishino was married to voice actress Vanessa Marshall. They had no children. During their marriage, they founded the voice-over production company Marsh-Kish Productions.

Currently, Kishino is a voice-over artist; his roles include Janja on The Lion Guard, Kevin in Steven Universe, and Saw Gerrera on Star Wars: The Clone Wars and The Bad Batch.

Kishino has dyslexia and is a member of Mensa.

Filmography

Animation

Films

Announcer/narration

Video games

Television

References

External links 
 

1970 births
Living people
Canadian male actors of Japanese descent
Canadian male rappers
Canadian male film actors
Canadian male television actors
Canadian male video game actors
Canadian male voice actors
Disney people
Animal impersonators
Pixar people
Audiobook narrators
Canadian musicians of Japanese descent
Place of birth missing (living people)
20th-century Canadian male actors
21st-century Canadian male actors
20th-century Canadian male musicians
20th-century Canadian rappers
Male actors from Toronto
Rappers from Toronto
Actors with dyslexia